The Last Supper Church It is a Catholic church in Rostov-on-Don in Russia, which depends on the Diocese of Saratov.

History
The history of the Catholic parish of Rostov-on-Don began in the second half of the nineteenth century, in a community that at that time had more than five thousand faithful. But like many churches in the country, Rostov church was destroyed by the Communists in the mid-twentieth century. The parish was reborn in 1992 when normal relations were established between the State and the various denominations after the fall of the Soviet Union. She received a small grant from a wooden chapel in October 1993.

The first stone of the present church was laid in the spring of 1999 and construction of the parish. The church was consecrated on September 19, 2004, by Bishop Bishop Pickel of Saratov. The number of faithful who regularly attend Mass is about four hundred people, many of whom are Catholic Armenian origin.

See also
Roman Catholicism in Russia
The Last Supper

References

Armenian diaspora in Russia
Roman Catholic churches in Russia
Churches in Rostov-on-Don
Roman Catholic churches completed in 2004
21st-century churches in Russia